Tricholoma mutabile is a mushroom of the agaric genus Tricholoma. Found in Yuba County, California, it was first described scientifically in 1996. The white gills are sinuate, and turn pale golden brown in maturity.

See also
List of North American Tricholoma
List of Tricholoma species

References

mutabile
Fungi described in 1996
Fungi of North America